The Plasma Shaft is a compilation box set of the Red Hot Chili Peppers. It was released in Australia and Japan as a bonus to Blood Sugar Sex Magik in a separate jewel case in 1994. It contains two discs: the normal Blood Sugar Sex Magik disc with all 17 tracks and a bonus disc with 8 tracks recorded during the sessions for the album, all of which were already released as B-sides to various singles, including the hit single "Soul to Squeeze".

Track listing 

 "Give It Away" (In Progress) – 4:36
 "If You Have to Ask" (Radio Mix) – 3:37 
 "Nobody Weird Like Me" (Live) –  5:05 
 "Sikamikanico" – 3:24
 "Breaking the Girl" (Radio Edit) – 4:29 
 "Fela's Cock" – 5:16
 "If You Have to Ask" (Friday Night Fever Blister Mix) – 6:35
 "Soul to Squeeze" – 4:50

Charts

Certifications

Notes

References

Red Hot Chili Peppers compilation albums
1994 compilation albums
Warner Records compilation albums